Events from the year 1972 in China.

Incumbents 
 Chairman of the Chinese Communist Party – Mao Zedong
 President of the People's Republic of China – vacant
 Premier of the People's Republic of China – Zhou Enlai
 Chairman of the National People's Congress – Zhu De
 Vice President of the People's Republic of China – Soong Ching-ling and Dong Biwu
 Vice Premier of the People's Republic of China – Deng Xiaoping

Governors  
 Governor of Anhui Province – Li Desheng
 Governor of Fujian Province – Han Xianchu
 Governor of Gansu Province – Xian Henghan 
 Governor of Guangdong Province – Liu Xingyuan (until April), Ding Sheng (starting April)
 Governor of Guizhou Province – Lan Yinong 
 Governor of Hebei Province – Liu Zihou 
 Governor of Heilongjiang Province – Wang Jiadao
 Governor of Henan Province – Liu Jianxun   
 Governor of Hubei Province – Zeng Siyu
 Governor of Hunan Province – Hua Guofeng  
 Governor of Jiangsu Province – Xu Shiyou 
 Governor of Jiangxi Province – Cheng Shiqing then She Jide 
 Governor of Jilin Province – Wang Huaixiang 
 Governor of Liaoning Province – Chen Xilian 
 Governor of Qinghai Province – Liu Xianquan 
 Governor of Shaanxi Province – Li Ruishan 
 Governor of Shandong Province – Yang Dezhi  
 Governor of Shanxi Province – Xie Zhenhua  
 Governor of Sichuan Province – Zhang Guohua (until March), Liu Xingyuan (starting March)
 Governor of Yunnan Province – Zhou Xing  
 Governor of Zhejiang Province – Nan Ping

Events 

 Shanghai Communiqué
 Nixon goes to China - 1972 Nixon visit to China - Nixon's China Game
 Japan-China Joint Communiqué
 Typhoon Ora
 Three Communiqués

Births 
 January 17 - Kang Hui, broadcaster
 Zheng Yongshan
 Liang Qin
 Xiao Jiangang

Deaths 

 Chen Yi - January 6
 Zhang Guohua - February 21
 Xie Fuzhi - March 26
 Chen Zhengren - April 6

See also 
 1972 in Chinese film

References 

 
Years of the 20th century in China
China